Finty May Trussler (born 8 May 2003) is an English cricketer who currently plays for Hampshire and Southern Vipers. She plays as a right-arm leg break bowler.

Domestic career
Trussler made her county debut in 2021, for Hampshire against Middlesex in the Women's Twenty20 Cup. She went on to be the leading wicket-taker across the whole tournament, taking 16 wickets in her 6 matches at an average of 6.50. In her third match of the tournament, she took her Twenty20 best bowling figures, of 4/12 against Sussex. She played three matches in the 2022 Women's Twenty20 Cup, taking one wicket. She joined Oxfordshire for the South Central Counties Cup, a 50-over tournament involving the counties in the South of England. She took 2/15 from her 7 overs in the opening match of the tournament.

Trussler was named in the Southern Vipers squad for the 2021 season, but did not play a match. She was not initially named in the side's squad for the 2022 season, but was first named in a matchday squad for the Vipers' match against Lightning on 16 July. She made her debut for the side on 17 September 2022, against Northern Diamonds in the Rachael Heyhoe Flint Trophy, taking 2/56 from her 10 overs. She played one more match for Vipers that season, against South East Stars in the Rachael Heyhoe Flint Trophy play-off, taking 2/12 from her 6.2 overs.

References

External links

2003 births
Living people
Place of birth missing (living people)
Hampshire women cricketers
Oxfordshire women cricketers
Southern Vipers cricketers